Thryptomene saxicola, commonly known as rock thryptomene, is a species of flowering plant in the family Myrtaceae and is endemic to the south-west of Western Australia. It is a spreading shrub with small oval or egg-shaped leaves and pale pink flowers arranged in leaf axils. It is hardy plant, common in cultivation, sometimes as "Payne's hybrid" or Thryptomene paynei.

Description
The flowers are pale pink to white with five sepals, five more or less circular petals and ten stamens. Flowering mainly occurs from February to November, but flowers are often present in most months.

Taxonomy
This species was first formally described in 1832 by Joseph Dalton Hooker in the Botanical Magazine and given the name Baeckea saxicola from an unpublished description by Allan Cunningham. In 1844, Johannes Conrad Schauer changed the name to Thryptomene saxicola in the journal Plantae Preissianae. The specific epithet (saxicola) means "rock-dweller".

Distribution and habitat
Thryptomene saxicola grows on granite outcrops and on hills in the Avon Wheatbelt, Esperance Plains, Jarrah Forest and Warren biogeographic regions of south-western Western Australia.

Use in horticulture
Rock thryptomene has been widely grown in gardens in most parts of Australia and overseas as well. It is a hardy plant in well-drained soil and is moderately frost-tolerant. Propagation is usually by cuttings.

Cultivars include:
F.C. Payne' ('paynei') - similar to the typical form, introduced to cultivation in the 1960s or before.
'Minginew' - mauve-pink flowers It has recently been hypothesized that this may be a form  of Thryptomene hyporhytis or an unnamed species.
'Pink Lace'- deeper pink flowers, compact form
'Seatonii'
'Supernova'- pale pink flowers

References

saxicola
Endemic flora of Western Australia
Rosids of Western Australia